Chaenophryne is a genus of dreamer fish (Oneirodidae).

Species
There are currently five recognized species in this genus:
 Chaenophryne draco Beebe, 1932 (Smooth-headed dreamer)
 Chaenophryne longiceps Regan, 1925 (Can-opener smooth-headed dreamer)
 Chaenophryne melanorhabdus Regan & Trewavas, 1932
 Chaenophryne quasiramifera Pietsch, 2007
 Chaenophryne ramifera Regan & Trewavas, 1932

References

Oneirodidae
Marine fish genera
Taxa named by Charles Tate Regan